The term Persian Church or Persian church may refer to:

 Church in the Persian Empire, incorporating various Christian denominations and communities in the Persian Empire (226-641)
 Church in Persia (Iran), in broader historical sense: Christian communities in Persia (Iran), up to the 21st century
 Nestorian Church of Persia, one of common designations for the Church of the East, during the Persian period

See also
Persian Empire of the Sassanids
Byzantine Church (disambiguation)